Jacob Peck (1779 – June 11, 1869) was a justice of the Tennessee Supreme Court from 1822 to 1834.

Born in Virginia, Peck was admitted to the practice of law in Tennessee in 1808, and was elected to the Tennessee Senate in 1821, representing Jefferson County and Greene County in eastern Tennessee. In August 1822, Peck was elected to a seat on the Tennessee Supreme Court vacated by the resignation of Thomas Emmerson. While serving on the Court, Peck authored a substantial portion of the Court's opinions, with 276 opinions signed.

Although little is known of his formal education, it is apparent that he was also versed in the arts:

Peck served until the creation of a new Court in the Constitution of 1834. Peck also compiled and published volume 7 of the Tennessee Reports.

References

Justices of the Tennessee Supreme Court
1779 births
1869 deaths
Tennessee state senators